Route 75, also known as Veterans Memorial Highway, is a two-lane expressway on the Avalon Peninsula of Newfoundland. The route begins at a trumpet interchange with Route 1 and continues north, bypassing communities along the western shore of Conception Bay until it ends at a junction with Route 70 south of Carbonear.
Construction of the highway was completed in 2002.

The entire route of Route 75 is a two-lane Freeway, with interchanges at all but the northernmost intersections, with those still having controlled access.

Route description

Route 75 begins at an interchange with Route 1 (Trans Canada Highway, Exit 31) in Roaches Line. It heads north to have an interchange with the southern end of Route 70 (Roaches Line) before leaving the community of Roaches Line and passing northwest through rural wooded areas. The highway has an interchange with Route 71 (Hodgewater Line) in Makinsons before passing through North River, where it has a partial interchange with North River Road. Route 75 now heads north through western portion of Bay Roberts, where it passes by a Rest Area/Visitor information center and has an interchange with Country Road. It then passes through the west sides of Spaniard's Bay, where it has a partial interchange with New Harbour Road, and Tilton, where it has its last full interchange with Route 73 (Back Track Road). The highway now turns northeast to enter Harbour Grace, where it comes closer to the coast as it has a controlled access at-grade intersection with Brynes Road. Route 75 comes to an end at the northern end of town at an at-grade intersection with Route 70 (Cathedral Street/Columbus Drive), with the road continuing north into Carbonear as Route 70.

Exit list

References

075